Harold Neil Hewitt (born 2 September 1938) is an Australian rowing coxswain. He was a Victorian state and Australian national champion who competed at the 1956 Summer Olympics where he won a bronze medal in the men's eight.

Club and state rowing
His senior rowing was with the Mercantile Rowing Club in Melbourne.
. He coxed the Mercantile men's senior eights which won the Victorian state championships in 1955 and 1956 and won the Tasmanian state championship in 1956. In 1956 he also coxed a Mercantile four to a state championship title.

He first made state selection for Victoria in 1955 in the men's eight contesting the King's Cup at the annual Australian Interstate Regatta. He was also in the stern of the 1956 Victorian King's Cup eight and steered that crew to victory.

International representative rowing
In 1956 for the Melbourne Olympics the winning Kings Cup Victorian eight was selected as the Australian men's eight excepting for the 3-man - Benfield from New South Wales. Hewitt steered the Australian eight in their Olympic campaign to a thrilling final where the Australian eight took it to the US and Canadian crews and came away with a bronze medal.

References

External links
 profile

1938 births
Living people
Australian male rowers
Coxswains (rowing)
Olympic rowers of Australia
Rowers at the 1956 Summer Olympics
Olympic bronze medalists for Australia
Olympic medalists in rowing
Medalists at the 1956 Summer Olympics